Christian Frederick Martin Sr. (January 31, 1796 – February 16, 1873) was a German-born American luthier who specialized in guitars and the founder of C. F. Martin & Company. He made the first guitar in the United States in the 1830s.

Early life and career
Born in Markneukirchen in the Electorate of Saxony to a family of cabinet makers, Martin became an apprentice of the guitar maker Johann Georg Stauffer of Vienna, Austria. Martin also became a foreman at Stauffer's workshop.<ref>Wheeler, Tom (1992). American guitars: an illustrated history.” Harper & Row. p. 248.</ref> Martin was the second of five children and was more commonly known as Friedrich, given the German custom of using the second given name. In Martin's case, four of the children's first given names are a derivation of Christian (Christiane, Christian, Christian and Christiana).

As a result of a dispute between the Cabinet Makers Guild, of which Martin was a member, and the Violin Makers Guild, Martin moved to the United States in 1833. The move occurred less than a year after his father Johann Georg Martin died, and, being the last alive of Johann Georg Martin’s progeny, he would have been free of familial obligations to emigrate. On arriving in New York City, he set up shop at 196 Hudson Street on the Lower West Side. Martin’s first workshop housed a small production setup in the back room, and a retail music store up front. This shop was the forerunner of C. F. Martin & Company, which is still family-owned and operated, whose current CEO is CF Martin's great-great-great grandson, CF Martin IV  .

At the insistence of his wife, Ottilia Kühle (daughter of the Maschinentischler'' [machine carpenter] and maker of pedal harps Karl Kühle in Vienna), Martin moved the guitar shop in 1838 to Nazareth, Pennsylvania where it is still located.

Martin's guitar construction and design innovations produced a model of flattop guitar that is still in use today.

See also
C. F. Martin & Company
Acoustic guitar

References

External links

  BBC: How Martin guitars became an 'American Stradivarius, 21 November 2013
Michael Lorenz:  "Stauffer Miscellanea", Vienna 2014

1796 births
1873 deaths
People from Markneukirchen
People from the Electorate of Saxony
German emigrants to the United States
Guitar makers
German musical instrument makers
American musical instrument makers
People from Nazareth, Pennsylvania